William John Cullen (7 December 1894 – 28 June 1960) was an Irish rugby international. He won one cap against England in 1920. Cullen also played first-class cricket while in British India, playing eight first-class matches for the Europeans cricket team and a combined Europeans and Parsees cricket team. He scored a total of 376 runs in his eight matches, at an average of 31.33 and a high score of 120, which came for the Europeans against the Muslims in the final of the 1927/28 Bombay Quadrangular. Cullen died in England in June 1960 at Hemingford Grey, Huntingdonshire.

References

External links
William Cullen at Scrum.com
IRFU Profile

1894 births
1960 deaths
People educated at Christ's Hospital
Irish rugby union players
Ireland international rugby union players
Monkstown Football Club players
Irish cricketers
Europeans cricketers
Europeans and Parsees cricketers
Rugby union centres